The greater occipital nerve is a nerve of the head. It is a spinal nerve, specifically the medial branch of the dorsal primary ramus of cervical spinal nerve 2. It arises from between the first and second cervical vertebrae, ascends, and then passes through the semispinalis muscle. It ascends further to supply the skin along the posterior part of the scalp to the vertex. It supplies sensation to the scalp at the top of the head, over the ear and over the parotid glands.

Structure 

The greater occipital nerve is the medial branch of the dorsal primary ramus of cervical spinal nerve 2. It may also involve fibres from cervical spinal nerve 3. It arises from between the first and second cervical vertebrae, along with the lesser occipital nerve. It ascends after emerging from below the suboccipital triangle beneath the obliquus capitis inferior muscle. Just below the superior nuchal ridge, it pierces the fascia. It ascends further to supply the skin along the posterior part of the scalp up to the vertex.

Function 
The greater occipital nerve supplies sensation to the scalp at the top of the head, over the ear and over the parotid glands.

Clinical significance 
Problems with the greater occipital nerve may be a cause of cervicogenic headaches. These may be referred to as occipital neuralgias. A common site, and usually misdiagnosed area of entrapment for the greater occipital nerve, is at the obliquus capitis inferior muscle. These may be treated with a temporary nerve block.

Occipital pain management 
Most people with tension headaches experience increasing intensity with time, and report pain originating in the back of the head (occipital) moving to the front of the head (supraorbital). Neurostimulation is sometimes used to treat tension headaches that originate from the occipital nerve.

Notes

Additional images

External links 
 Image at theberries.ns.ca
 http://www.dartmouth.edu/~humananatomy/figures/chapter_47/47-2.HTM 
 http://www.dartmouth.edu/~humananatomy/figures/chapter_47/47-6.HTM

Spinal nerves